Alison Bell (born 1983) is a Northern Irish international lawn bowler.

Bell won the bronze medal in the fours at the 2008 World Outdoor Bowls Championship in Christchurch.

References

Female lawn bowls players from Northern Ireland
Living people
1983 births